Maryscott O'Connor (born April 29, 1968) is a blogger best known as the founder and editor-in-chief of My Left Wing, a blog that focused on politics.

She first came to prominence as a blogger at Daily Kos, a left wing blog that My Left Wing "spun off" from.  While she was politically aware, she was prompted to blog shortly after a series of events in the 2000s, noting in a Washington Post profile of her blog that, even in her anger, she felt "more connected" than ever.  While she quickly became one of the more popular writers at Daily Kos, she was eventually banned from the site over a copyright issue, but My Left Wing continued to gain popularity, averaging 14,000 page views a day as of summer 2006.

References

External links
 My Left Wing

1968 births
Living people
20th-century American journalists
American bloggers